Antiochus VII Euergetes (c. 164/160 BC129 BC), nicknamed Sidetes (from Side, a city in Asia Minor), also known as Antiochus the Pious, was ruler of the Hellenistic Seleucid Empire from July/August 138 to 129 BC. He was the last Seleucid king of any stature. After Antiochus was killed in battle, the Seleucid realm was restricted to Syria.

Biography

Early life and early reign
He was one of the sons of Demetrius I Soter, the brother of Demetrius II Nicator and his mother may have been Laodice V. Antiochus was elevated after Demetrius was captured by the Parthians. He married Cleopatra Thea, who had been the wife of Demetrius. Their offspring was Antiochus IX, who thus became both half-brother and cousin to Seleucus V and Antiochus VIII.

In his nine-year reign, Antiochus made some effort to undo the massive territorial and authority losses of recent decades.  Antiochus defeated the usurper Diodotus Tryphon at Dora and laid siege to Jerusalem in 134 BC. During the siege he allowed a seven-day truce for the Jews to celebrate a religious festival, impressing the Jewish leadership.<ref>Josephus Antiquities of the Jews Book XIII, 8</ref> According to Josephus the Hasmonean leader John Hyrcanus opened King David's sepulchre and removed three thousand talents, which he then paid Antiochus to spare the city. Nevertheless, King Antiochus' respectful treatment of the Jews, and respect for their religion, earned him their gratitude and added name Euergetes'' ("the Benefactor"). With no Jewish sources of that time (the Book of Maccabees ends a few years before his time), it is unclear if the siege of Jerusalem ended with a decisive Seleucid victory or simply a peace treaty. Furthermore, Jewish forces later assisted Antiochus in his wars, and for nearly 20 years after his death, John Hyrcanus refrained from attacking areas under Seleucid control.

Later territory disputes and defeat

Antiochus spent the final years of his life attempting to reclaim the lost eastern territories, overrun by the Parthians under their "Great King", Mithridates I. Marching east, with what would prove to be the last great Seleucid royal army (including a unit of Judean troops under John Hyrcanus), he defeated Mithridates in two battles. He restored Mesopotamia, Babylonia and Media to the Seleucid empire, before dispersing his army into winter quarters.

The Seleucid king and army spent the winter feasting, hunting and drinking (the Seleucids maintained the Macedonian tradition of heavy drinking). As with any time an army is quartered upon a population, tensions soon grew between the locals and the Syrian troops.

The new Parthian ruler, Phraates II, had not been idle.  He raised a new army while stirring up rebellion in the Seleucid occupied towns of Media. Hoping to further sow dissension amongst his foes, Phraates also released his long-held prisoner, Demetrius II, Antiochus' older brother, who returned to Syria to reclaim the throne.

That winter (130–129 BC), several Median towns rose in rebellion and attacked their Seleucid garrisons. Antiochus marched to support one such isolated garrison with only a small force (probably only his Royal Guards). In a barren valley, he was ambushed and killed in the Battle of Ecbatana by Phraates II and a large force of Parthians, who had entered the country without being detected. After the battle the Parthians claimed that Antiochus killed himself because of fear. Most Greco-Roman historians state that he died in battle. Appian, however, states that he did commit suicide.

Succession 
Antiochus's confirmed heir was Antiochus IX Cyzicenus. But a fragment from book 16 of Posidonius' "Histories", which survives in the Deipnosophistae written by Athenaeus, mentions a king named Seleucus, who was captured in Media by king Arsaces and treated like royalty. The identity of this Seleucus have been a matter of debate; the possibility of Seleucus being a son of Antiochus VII captured after the death of his father is suggested by Felix Jacoby and, with reservations, by Ian G. Kidd.

See also

 List of Syrian monarchs
 Timeline of Syrian history

References

Sources

External links
Antiochus VII Sidetes entry in historical sourcebook by Mahlon H. Smith

2nd-century BC Seleucid rulers
Seleucid rulers
Ptolemaic dynasty
Monarchs killed in action
2nd-century BC rulers
160s BC births
129 BC deaths
Year of birth uncertain
Kings of Syria
2nd-century BC Babylonian kings